American Koreans may refer to:
Americans in North Korea, residents of North Korea from the United States
Americans in South Korea, residents of South Korea from the United States
Korean Americans, United States citizens of Korean descent